The Passaguai Family (Italian: La Famiglia Passaguai) is a 1951 Italian comedy film written, starring and directed by Aldo Fabrizi. It also featured Peppino De Filippo, Ave Ninchi and Giovanna Ralli. It was followed by a sequel  The Passaguai Family Gets Rich in 1952. It follows the misadventures of a lower middle-class family and their friends from Rome when they take a day's outing at the seaside.

It was shot at the Ponti-De Laurentiis Studios in Rome and on location around the city and at the resort of Fiumicino at the mouth of the River Tiber near Ostia. Distributed by the Italian branch of the Rank Organisation it was a major hit, taking domestic box office earnings of 378 million lira.

In 2008 the film was selected to enter the list of the 100 Italian films to be saved.

Cast
 Aldo Fabrizi as Cav. Peppe Passaguai
 Ave Ninchi as Margherita, moglie di Peppe
 Peppino De Filippo as Rag. Mazza, collega di Peppe
 Tino Scotti as Comm. Villetti, capufficio di Peppe
 Nyta Dover as Marisa, segretaria
 Giovanna Ralli as Marcella, figlia maggiore dei Passaguai
 Carlo Delle Piane as Gino (detto Pecorino), secondo figlio dei Passaguai
 Giancarlo Zarfati as Gnappetta, figlio minore dei Passaguai
 Luigi Pavese as Alberto
 Jole Silvani as Jole
 Pietro De Vico as l'innamorato di Marcella
 Alberto Sorrentino

References

Bibliography
 Chiti, Roberto & Poppi, Roberto. Dizionario del cinema italiano: Dal 1945 al 1959. Gremese Editore, 1991.
 Gundle, Stephen. Fame Amid the Ruins: Italian Film Stardom in the Age of Neorealism. Berghahn Books, 2019.

External links
 
 The Passaguai Family at Variety Distribution

1951 films
1950s Italian-language films
Films set in Rome
Films shot in Rome
Italian comedy films
1951 comedy films
Italian black-and-white films
Films directed by Aldo Fabrizi
1950s Italian films